The IEEE Medal of Honor is the highest recognition of the Institute of Electrical and Electronics Engineers (IEEE). It has been awarded since 1917, when its first recipient was Major Edwin H. Armstrong. It is given for an exceptional contribution or an extraordinary career in the IEEE fields of interest. The award consists of a gold medal, bronze replica, certificate, and honorarium. The Medal of Honor may only be awarded to an individual.

The medal was created by the Institute of Radio Engineers (IRE) as the IRE Medal of Honor. It became the IEEE Medal of Honor when IRE merged with the American Institute of Electrical Engineers (AIEE) to form the IEEE in 1963. It was decided that IRE's Medal of Honor would be presented as IEEE's highest award, while the Edison Medal would become IEEE's principal medal. Edward Field Sanford, Jr. designed the medal in 1917.

Twelve persons with an exceptional career in electrical engineering received both the IEEE Edison Medal and the IEEE Medal of Honor, namely Edwin Howard Armstrong, Ernst Alexanderson, Mihajlo Pupin, Arthur E. Kennelly, Vladimir K. Zworykin, John R. Pierce, Sidney Darlington, James L. Flanagan, Nick Holonyak, Robert H. Dennard, Dave Forney, and Kees Schouhamer Immink.

Recipients

See equivalent awards
 IET Faraday Medal
 Queen Elizabeth Prize for Engineering
 Nobel Prize

Others
 List of engineering awards
 List of prizes named after people

References

External links 

 
Academic awards
Awards established in 1917

Honor